Adrian John Flowers (11 July 1926 – 18 May 2016) was a British photographer known for his portraits of celebrities that included Twiggy, Paul McCartney, Linda McCartney and Vanessa Redgrave.

Early life
Flowers was educated at Sherborne School, Dorset, the son of a former Indian Army officer. His mother was a Christian Scientist.

Career
Flowers took exams at the Institute of British Photography in 1950 and set up a studio in Dover Street the same year. He later had a studio in Tite Street, Chelsea. He was known for his advertising work, particularly for Benson & Hedges cigarettes, and also for his portraits of celebrities that included Twiggy, Paul McCartney, Linda McCartney and Vanessa Redgrave.

Flowers' assistants included Terence Donovan and Brian Duffy, and Chris Killip.

Family
Flowers married Angela Holland, who established Angela Flowers Gallery in 1970 in London. They had four children: Adam, Matthew, Dan and Francesca. Matthew Flowers is the contemporary art dealer who now runs Flowers Gallery. In 1985, Adrian Flowers married a second time to Francoise Lina, a French conference interpreter, and they lived until his death in southwest France.

References

External links 
Documentary by Luke Tomlinson (video)

1926 births
2016 deaths
20th-century British photographers
People educated at Sherborne School
21st-century British photographers
Photographers from Dorset